Abella de la Conca is a village and municipi in the province of Lleida in the county of Pallars Jussà and the autonomous community of Catalonia, Spain. The municipality is situated on the eastern bank of the Tremp Basin. It comprises the high valleys of the Abella River tributary of the Conques river on its right bank and of the Rams River. The valley of the latter is sandwiched between the Boumort and Carreu mountains. In addition to the Tremp Basin, it comprises a section of the Puials River valley. A portion of the village houses are semi-excavated in the rock.

Places of interest
 Sant Esteve Church in Abella de la Conca
 Santa Maria Church
 Sant Vicenç church of Bóixols
 Church of the Verge in Carránima
 Church of Sant Miquel in Abella de la Conca
 Church of the Holy Trinitat in Faidella
 Church of Santa Maria in Mas Palou
 Church of Sant Antoni in La Rua
 Molí del Plomall
 Ruins of the Abella de la Conca Castle

Population entities

Population change

References

External links
 Government data pages 

Municipalities in Pallars Jussà
Populated places in Pallars Jussà